Robert Parr (1921–2017) was an American theoretical chemist.

Robert Parr or Bob Parr may also refer to:

 Erle Stanley Gardner (1889–1970), author who wrote under this name
 Bob Parr (TV producer) (born 1957), English-born New Zealand producer
 Bob Parr, fictional animated film character (also known as Mr. Incredible) from The Incredibles
 Robert Parr, song contributor to American band The Bottle Rockets